Hunted is a 2012 British television drama series created and written by Frank Spotnitz and produced by Kudos and Big Light Productions for British broadcaster BBC, for its main channel BBC One and American premium cable broadcaster Cinemax. The series premiered on Thursday 4 October 2012 on BBC One and on Friday 19 October 2012 on Cinemax.

Overview
Samantha (Melissa George) is an espionage operative for "Byzantium", a private intelligence agency. She survives an attempt on her life, which she strongly suspects was orchestrated by members of the company she works for. After recovering and returning to active duty, she goes back to work undercover as a nanny, not knowing who tried to kill her or whom to trust. It becomes evident that the attempt on her life is tied into a horrific event from her childhood.

Main cast
Melissa George as Samantha "Sam" Hunter/Alex Kent
Adam Rayner as Aidan Marsh 
Stephen Dillane as Rupert Keel
Stephen Campbell Moore as Stephen Turner
Adewale Akinnuoye-Agbaje as Deacon Crane
Morven Christie as Zoe Morgan
Lex Shrapnel as Ian Fowkes
Dhaffer L'Abidine as Bernard Faroux
Dermot Crowley as George Ballard
Oscar Kennedy as Edward Turner
Indira Varma as Natalie Thorpe
Patrick Malahide as Jack Turner
Doc Brown as Tyrone
Richard Lintern as Hector Stokes
Uriel Emil Pollack as Hasan Moussa

Production
The series was created by Frank Spotnitz (best known as executive producer and head writer for The X-Files), who will write the majority of the episodes of series 1. Spotnitz is executive producing with Kudos' Stephen Garrett (executive producer of Law & Order: UK, Spooks/MI5), Jane Featherstone (producer behind Spooks/MI5, The Hour, Life on Mars), Alison Jackson (Ashes to Ashes, Eternal Law), and BBC's Christopher Aird (Spooks, The Inspector Lynley Mysteries).

After Spotnitz had wrapped up The X-Files he met Stephen Garrett and Jane Featherstone of Kudos Film and Television. They asked him to come to the UK and work with British television. Spotnitz had lived in Europe before and was interested in returning. He claims the idea was appealing but it simply never happened. The years passed and Spotnitz was talking to The X-Files star Gillian Anderson, who was visiting Los Angeles from London where she lives, and she asked, "Would you ever consider doing a show (in Britain)?". Spotnitz started talking to her about doing a spy series and then the first call he made was to Stephen Garrett since the two lost touch. "You know the idea of doing a show in England? I think I may finally have it".

On 13 January 2011, the BBC announced the show – then called Morton. Gillian Anderson was no longer attached to the show; it took Spotnitz and Kudos longer than estimated to get the green light from the BBC and by then, Anderson was too busy with other projects.

Spotnitz relocated to London with his family. While trying to get Hunted off the ground, he served as co-producer and head writer for Strike Back: Project Dawn (or just Strike Back in the United States), which was also produced by HBO for Cinemax, but co-produced with another British broadcaster, BSkyB (for Sky1), not the BBC.

On 22 September 2011, reports confirmed that HBO/Cinemax would come on board as co-producers and that the name Morton had been scrapped and the new name was Nemesis. On 6 March 2012, Spotnitz announced on his homepage that the show's title had been changed again to Hunted.

Spotnitz spent a lot of time researching private spy agencies. He told Screen International: "It's not an area I was very aware of until I went looking for it. Most private contractors don't want to be noticed. Their websites are dry and boring and they don't want the wrong kind of attention. I talked to people who run these companies in the US, United Kingdom and Switzerland and then I researched the type of personality working at them".

Filming started on location in Wales, Scotland, London and Morocco. In early March, scenes were filmed in East Linton, Scotland at a local Deli Shop. "There are no sound stages. It's all location filming. It’s really expensive and difficult to do, but it looks so much better and has a real feel of authenticity", Spotnitz told The Hollywood Reporter. "It's international and it looks international".

During the series, Sam has childhood memories of an oast house and in episode 5 she finds the Oast House. This is the oast house at Little Scotney Farm, Lamberhurst, Kent. It is still a working oast house owned by the National Trust, producing hops to make "Scotney Ale".

The first series takes place mainly in London. Had the show been commissioned for a second series, each series would have taken place in a different European city. George, who is based in New York, would have lived in London for six months to film each series.

Sam Hunter spinoff
On 25 September 2012, it was reported that British screenwriter Ben Harris had joined the writing team in preparation for a second series pickup from BBC One and Cinemax.

Melissa George has reported that the second series of Hunted would be set in Berlin. The Australian star previously said that her Hunted role "could potentially be long-term", adding that she may be playing Sam "for the next five years".

On 3 November 2012, it was reported that British screenwriter Claire Wilson had joined the writing team in preparation for a second series pickup from BBC One and Cinemax.

However, on 14 November 2012, The Guardian reported that BBC One had decided not to commission a second series of Hunted, citing ratings declines as the primary reason. It was reported the following day that Cinemax was looking into making a second series without the partnership with the BBC. Cinemax has since announced that it is working with Frank Spotnitz to reboot the show, describing the current incarnation as "too expensive" to continue without BBC support.

Spotnitz has revealed that the original plans for Hunted series two – which would have followed Sam Hunter to Germany – have been abandoned in the wake of the series shake-up. "It's going to change – that [Berlin plot] was when we still had the BBC as a partner", he explained. "Now it's one of those funny things where it's the same character, but it's a different series." Spotnitz added that he "would very much expect" future episodes to air in the UK, adding that he has considered other British networks as potential partners.

In June 2013 it was announced that the second series would become a four-hour miniseries called Sam Hunter, airing in 2014.

In early 2015, Frank Spotnitz stated that the series–and spinoff–had been officially cancelled by Cinemax, though he and George were open to continuing the project if it were to be picked up by another network.

Episode list

DVD release
On 30 July 2013 HBO Home Entertainment released the complete series on DVD in Region 1 via the Warner Archive Collection. This is a manufacture-on-demand (MOD) release, available via WBShop.com and Amazon.com. The series is also available on DVD and Blu-ray in the UK.

Web campaign
Hunted was accompanied by an Internet campaign carrying content developed during the filming of the series. Known for a psychologically stimulating internet campaign where one would guess what dongle went to various computers. It all turned out to be a honeypot.

Reception
Reviews of the first episode were mixed. While he liked the plot, Michael Hogan of The Daily Telegraph was critical of the dialogue and acting: "The protagonist pouts constantly and came across more sulky teenager than troubled soul. When you're performing this hokum, you need a heavyweight cast to give it credibility. Spooks had Matthew MacFadyen and Peter Firth, 24 had Kiefer Sutherland, Homeland has Damian Lewis and Claire Danes. Hunted'''s assorted pretty young things are nowhere near that league. They gazed moodily out of windows but rather than looking haunted by the terrible things they’d seen, they looked like they were waiting for a minicab". The Observers Andrew Anthony compared the series unfavourably with the U.S. television series Homeland: "Both have high production values, both are capable of creating fiendishly clever plots, but whereas Homeland seeks to foreground character, Hunted relies on shorthand caricature. Thus the three villains on display last week were a macho Arab, an inscrutable psychopath and a cockney gangster-turned-businessman, holding their faces in such ways as to convey, respectively, machismo, psychopathy, and tasty geezerness". Jim Shelley of the Daily Mirror was also critical, writing that Hunted "relied more on old-fashioned Spooks cliches. Locations like Istanbul were viewed as dangerous – ie, full of foreigners, particularly handsome Arabs in suits driving around as if they were in a BMW ad".

On a more positive note, Ken Tucker of Entertainment Weekly, said the U.S. première had "lots of slick suspense, well-turned violence, and a delightful air of menace hanging over everything Sam does". Maureen Ryan of The Huffington Post also had a favorable review of the U.S. premiere saying "To its credit, 'Hunted' doesn't take its profoundly disconnected characters and slap them into a slick, glitzy story about heroism in the face of greed. It marries the doubt, regret and longing they feel into a chugging, twisty spy story about the cost of selling your soul one piece at a time".

 See also 
 The East''—a film about an undercover operative for a private intelligence company

References

External links
 
 Hunted at Cinemax
 

2012 British television series debuts
2010s British drama television series
2012 British television series endings
British action television series
BBC television dramas
Cinemax original programming
Espionage television series
Television shows set in London
Television series by Endemol
English-language television shows